Elections to Dundee City Council were held on 3 May 2007, the same day as the other Scottish local government elections and the Scottish Parliament general election.

The election was the first one to use the new 8 wards created as a result of the Local Governance (Scotland) Act 2004, each ward will elect three or four councillors using the single transferable vote system form of proportional representation. The new wards replace 29 single-member wards which used the plurality (first past the post) system of election.

The SNP had the largest number of seats but the council was initially controlled by a Labour and Liberal Democrat coalition, with the support of the Conservatives. This changed after a March 2009 By Election result tipped the balance in the SNPs direction.

Election results

The votes and percentage of vote share are based on first preference votes.

Ward results

Strathmartine

Lochee

West End

Coldside

Maryfield

North East

East End

The Ferry

Changes Since 2007 Election
†On 24 March 2009, Lochee Cllr John Letford became an Independent after leaving the Labour Party

By-Elections(since 3 May 2007)
A by-election was held in the Lochee ward on 22 November 2007, following the resignation of Nigel Don MSP, subsequent to his election to the Scottish Parliament. The seat was retained by the party's Alan Ross

A by-election was held in the Maryfield ward on 12 March 2009, following the resignation of Labour Cllr Joe Morrow, subsequent to his appointment by the Scottish Government as president of the Mental Health Tribunal for Scotland. The seat was won by the SNP's Craig Melville

References

External links
Dundee City Council website

2007
2007 Scottish local elections
21st century in Dundee